A headland, also known as a head, is a coastal landform, a point of land usually high and often with a sheer drop, that extends into a body of water. It is a type of promontory. A headland of considerable size often is called a cape. Headlands are characterised by high, breaking waves, rocky shores, intense erosion, and steep sea cliff.

Headlands and bays are often found on the same coastline. A bay is flanked by land on three sides, whereas a headland is flanked by water on three sides. Headlands and bays form on discordant coastlines, where bands of rock of alternating resistance run perpendicular to the coast. Bays form when weak (less resistant) rocks (such as sands and clays) are eroded, leaving bands of stronger (more resistant) rocks (such as chalk, limestone, and granite) forming a headland, or peninsula. Through the deposition of sediment within the bay and the erosion of the headlands, coastlines eventually straighten out, then start the same process all over again.

List of notable headlands

Africa

, Mauritania
Cap-Vert, Senegal
Cape Agulhas, South Africa, Africa's southernmost point
Cape Bojador, Morocco
Cape Correntes, Mozambique
Cape Delgado, Mozambique
Cape Juby, Morocco
Cape Malabata, Morocco
Cape Spartel, Morocco
Cape of Good Hope, South Africa
, Tunisia, Africa's northernmost point

Asia
Beirut, Lebanon
Cabo de Rama, Goa, India
Cape Dezhnev, Russia
Cape Comorin or Kanyakumari, Tamil Nadu, India
Cape Engaño, Philippines
 Coconut Tree Hill, Mirissa, Sri Lanka
Indira Point, Andaman and Nicobar Islands, India

Europe

Beachy Head, England
, Portugal, the western tip of mainland Europe
Cap Gris-Nez, France
Cape Arkona, Germany
Cape Emine, Bulgaria
Cape Enniberg, Faroe Islands
Cape Finisterre, Galicia, Spain
Cape Greco, Cyprus
Cape Kaliakra, Bulgaria
Cape St. Vincent/Sagres Point, Portugal, the southwestern tip of mainland Europe
Cape Tainaron, Greece, the southern tip of mainland Europe
Cape Wrath, Scotland
Dungeness, England
Gibraltar, British Overseas Territory
Great Orme, Wales
Land's End, Cornwall, England
Mull of Kintyre, Scotland
North Cape, Norway, the northern tip of mainland Europe
Pointe du Raz, France
St Bees Head, UK, the most westerly point of northern England

North America

Canada
Cape Chidley, Newfoundland and Labrador/Nunavut
Cape Columbia, Nunavut, Canada's northernmost point
Cape Freels, Newfoundland and Labrador
Cape Norman, Newfoundland and Labrador
Cape Spear, Newfoundland and Labrador, Canada's easternmost point
Cape Tormentine, New Brunswick
Leslie Street Spit, Toronto, Ontario - man made landform

Greenland
Cape Farewell, Greenland's southernmost point

Mexico
, Baja California Sur, Mexico

United States
Cape Ann, Massachusetts
Cape Canaveral, Florida
Cape Charles, Virginia
Cape Cod, Massachusetts
Cape Fear, North Carolina
Cape Flattery, Washington
Cape Hatteras, North Carolina
Cape Henlopen, Delaware
Cape Henry, Virginia
Cape May, New Jersey
Cape Mendocino, California
Cape Prince of Wales, Alaska
Cascade Head, Oregon
Heceta Head, Oregon
Hilton Head, South Carolina
Marin Headlands, California
Mount Mitchill, New Jersey
North Shore, Lake Superior, Minnesota
Point Reyes, California
West Quoddy Head, Maine

Oceania

Australia
Cape Leeuwin, Western Australia
Cape York Peninsula, Queensland
South East Cape, Tasmania
South West Cape, Tasmania
Sydney Heads, New South Wales

New Zealand
Cape Egmont
Cape Foulwind
Cape Reinga
East Cape
North Cape
Young Nick's Head

United States (Hawaii)
Diamond Head, Hawaii
Koko Head, Hawaii

South America

Cape Froward, Chile
Cape Horn, Chile, South America's southernmost point
Cape Virgenes, Argentina

See also
Cape (geography)
Headland-bay beach

References 

 
Coastal and oceanic landforms
Coastal geography

fr:Cap (géographie)
gv:Kione çheerey
hi:रास (भूमि प्रकार)
tr:Burun (coğrafya)